The 44th Ryder Cup Matches will be held in Italy in autumn 2023 at Marco Simone Golf and Country Club in Guidonia Montecelio near Rome. The biennial event was originally scheduled from 30 September to 2 October 2022, before the 43rd matches were postponed into 2021 due to the COVID-19 pandemic. The United States is the holder of the Ryder Cup after its 19–9 victory over Europe in 2021 at Whistling Straits.

Host selection
The bidding process for the 2023 Ryder Cup opened on 23 June 2014. Countries had until 31 August to formally express an interest. These expressions had to come either from a central government or a national golf governing body. On 14 December 2015, Rome was announced as the host of 2022 Ryder Cup. Italy beat Germany, Austria and Spain to win the bid for 44th edition of Ryder Cup.

Bidding locations

Declared an interest but did not enter an official bid

Course

Format
The Ryder Cup is a match play event, with each match worth one point. The competition format will be as follows:
Day 1 (Friday) – 4 foursome (alternate shot) matches and 4 fourball (better ball) matches
Day 2 (Saturday) – 4 foursome matches and 4 fourball matches
Day 3 (Sunday) – 12 singles matches

On the first two days there are 4 foursome matches and 4 fourball matches with the home captain choosing which are played in the morning and which in the afternoon.

With a total of 28 points available, 14 points are required to win the Cup, and 14 points are required for the defending champion to retain the Cup.  All matches are played to a maximum of 18 holes.

Teams

Captains
Both team captains were announced in early 2022; Zach Johnson was named as the U.S. team captain on February 28, and Henrik Stenson as the European team captain on March 15. Stenson was removed from the role in July 2022 due to his decision to join LIV Golf. On 1 August 2022, Luke Donald was announced as the new captain of the European team.

Vice captains
For the U.S. team, Steve Stricker was named as the first vice-captain. On January 17, 2023, Davis Love III was named as the second vice-captain.

For the European team, Thomas Bjørn and Edoardo Molinari were named by Stenson as vice captains. They were retained as vice-captains by Donald. In November 2022, Donald named Nicolas Colsaerts as the team's third vice-captain.

Team selection

United States
The United States qualification rules were confirmed along with the announcement of Johnson as captain on 28 February 2022. There was no change from the amended selection process used for the previous Ryder Cup, with six players qualifying from the Ryder Cup points list and six captain's picks.

Europe
The European team qualification rules were announced on 30 August 2022. There were several changes from the previous Ryder Cup, with three qualifiers from each of the European and World points lists and the number of captain's picks increased from three to six; the weighting of points was also changed, with highest ranked events now worth 4 times the lowest, having been six times the value previously.

Notes

References

External links

2023
2023 Ryder Cup
2023 Ryder Cup
2023 in golf
September 2023 sports events in Europe
Scheduled sports events